MQS can refer to:
 Mustique Airport, IATA code MQS
 Chester County G. O. Carlson Airport, FAA location identifier MQS